National Women's League may refer to:

 National Women's League (Canada), a women's rugby union league in Canada
 National Women's League (Ghana), a women's football league in Ghana
 National Women's League (New Zealand), a women's football league in New Zealand

See also
 Women's National League (disambiguation)